is a town located in Tokachi Subprefecture, Hokkaido, Japan.

As of September 2016, the town has an estimated population of 2,528 and a density of 4.2 persons per km². The total area is 608.81 km².

Climate
Rikubetsu is ranked as Japan's coldest area.

Mascots

Shibare-kun is a Siberian boy from the Amur River area. He sailed to Japan through the trails of drift ice. He carries a thermometer to remind everyone that Rikubetsu is Japan's coldest place.
Tsurara-chan is a Canadian girl. She flew to Japan through the path of the aurora borealis. Her goal is to prevent climate change.

References

External links

Official Website 

Towns in Hokkaido